Basarbovo is a village in Northeast Bulgaria, in the Municipality of Ruse. As of 2018, the population is 1 416.

Geography 
Basarbovo is located in close proximity to Ruse. It is surrounded by hills on all sides, resulting in a softer climate than the nearby city.
The river Rusenski Lom passes through it. As a result, a canyon is formed, similar to the one in the nearby Rusenski Lom Nature Park. This is one of the oldest climbing sites in Bulgaria.

In geological history, the territory of Basarbovo was once covered by Black Sea, resulting in limestone formations.

History 

It is believed that the area is inhabited since the antiquity. There are a number of Thracian votive tile discovered, the oldest one dated to III - II century BC depicting a horse rider. Due to this it is believed that the site has been a place of worship long before the establishment of Basarbovo Monastery.

Its earliest mention is from 1431 in an Ottoman tax register. According to it, there were 14 households in the village with predominantly ethnic Bulgarian population.

During the Ottoman rule in Bulgaria, the village was located on the hill northwest of its current position. After it was burnt down several times, in 1803 the settlement moved to its current position.

Name 
In its earliest mentions, the village is indicated as Monastery Basaraba, evolving later on in Basarbovo.

It is hypothesized that it is called after Basarab I of Wallachia, as it may have been in his land. Another theory is that it is founded by settlers from Bessarabia, although this is disputed as there are evidence that the village is founded by settlers from the Balkan village Dryanovo.

Commonly the village is incorrectly called Besarbovo, probably due to confusion with Bessarabia.

Main sights

Basarbovo Monastery 

Basarbovo Monastery is located in walking distance from Basarbovo. It was founded during the Second Bulgarian Empire (XII-XIV cent.), but the oldest written mention of it dates to 1431 in an Ottoman tax register.
It is the only active cave monastery in the modern history of Bulgaria. It was named a historical landmark in 1978.

Others 
Basarbovo Ridge in Antarctica is named after the village.

References

External links 

 Page of the town hall of Basarbovo

Villages in Ruse Province